Arija Allison Bareikis is an American actress. She is best known for her role as Officer Chickie Brown in the TV crime drama Southland. She is also known for the films Deuce Bigalow: Male Gigolo and The Purge.

Early life and education
Bareikis's first name is Lithuanian. She is a 1988 graduate of Stanford University. Her mother is Carol Harton and her father, Bob Bareikis, is a professor of Germanic literature at Indiana University. She has one sister, Anitra.

Career
Bareikis starred alongside Rob Schneider as Kate in Deuce Bigalow: Male Gigolo (1999) and played LAPD police officer Chickie Brown in the police drama series Southland for its first three seasons. , Bareikis' most recent screen role was a 2016 episode of the television series Power, as MJ.

Filmography

References

External links
 
 

Actresses from Indiana
American film actresses
21st-century American actresses
American people of Lithuanian descent
American television actresses
Living people
Stanford University alumni
21st-century American women
Year of birth missing (living people)